Bocher is a surname. Notable people with the surname include:

Christiane Bøcher (1798–1874), Norwegian stage actress who was engaged at the Christiania Offentlige Theater
Édouard Bocher (1811–1900), French politician who was one of the founders of the Conférence Molé-Tocqueville
Herbert Böcher (1903–1983), German middle-distance runner who competed in the 1928 Summer Olympics
Joan Bocher (died 1550), English Anabaptist burned at the stake for heresy
Main Bocher (1890–1976), American fashion designer who founded the fashion label Mainbocher
Maxime Bôcher (1867–1918), American mathematician who published about 100 papers on differential equations, series, and algebra
Tyge W. Böcher (1909–1983), Danish botanist, evolutionary biologist, plant ecologist and phytogeographer

See also
Bôcher Memorial Prize, founded by the American Mathematical Society in 1923 in memory of Maxime Bôcher
Bôcher's theorem can refer to one of two theorems proved by the American mathematician Maxime Bôcher
Boucher (surname)